Norman Cole may refer to:

 Norman Cole (politician) (1909–1979), British Conservative and National Liberal Member of Parliament
 Norman Cole (footballer) (1913–1976), English footballer with several clubs, including Southampton and Norwich City